Vahe Haykazuni (351 BC – 331 BC), also known simply as Vahe, was a king of Armenia. He was the last offspring of the Hayk Dynasty.

According to Moses of Khoren, he was an ally of Darius III, King of Persia. He revolted against Alexander the Great but was killed in battle.

Because of his bravery, his name Vahe, became synonymous for the Armenians as a true warrior and a true king. Many Armenians are named Vahe (or Vahé) after him, Vahe being a common given name.

With his death, the Armenian Haykazuni dynasty came to an end and Armenia was subjected to 10 years of Macedonian rule.

See also
List of Armenian Kings

References

351 BC births
331 BC deaths
Kings of Armenia